Vancouver Football Club, commonly known as Vancouver FC, is a Canadian professional soccer club in Langley, British Columbia. The club competes in the Canadian Premier League at the top of the Canadian soccer league system.

History
On November 10, 2021, the Canadian Premier League announced that it had awarded an expansion club in Vancouver to SixFive Sports and Entertainment LP. More details were announced on April 13, 2022, when the CPL and SixFive announced that the new club would play in Langley, British Columbia, at the Willoughby Community Park adjacent to the Langley Events Centre.

On November 2, 2022, the club held its official launch event where it announced its name, revealed its branding, and presented Afshin Ghotbi as the club's first head coach. The CPL announced that the club would begin play in the 2023 season.

Crest and colours
The primary crest is circular and features the name of the club and year of establishment in the outer ring. In the centre is a stylized eagle in the shape of the letter V.

The club colours are black, grey, and red (branded as charcoal black, silver, warm red, dark grey, and cinder).

Stadium
Vancouver FC will play in a new stadium at Langley's Willoughby Community Park. It will have a capacity of 6,560 seats in its initial configuration with potential for further expansion. Construction began in February 2023 using modular prefabricated elements.

Players and staff

Roster

Staff

Head coaches

Team records

Year-by-year

References

External links

Vancouver FC
Association football clubs established in 2022
Canadian Premier League teams
Soccer clubs in Vancouver
2022 establishments in British Columbia